Brenda Webster (born 21 July 1961) is a Canadian former short track and long track speed skater. She competed in three events at the 1980 Winter Olympics. She became the world champion at the World Short Track Speed Skating Championships in 1977.

She was induced to the Saskatchewan Sportshall Of Fame in 1991.

References

External links 
 

1961 births
Living people
Canadian female speed skaters
Canadian female short track speed skaters
Olympic speed skaters of Canada
Speed skaters at the 1980 Winter Olympics
Sportspeople from Regina, Saskatchewan
20th-century Canadian women